The Timoney Stones are a collection of standing stones forming a National Monument in County Tipperary, Ireland.

Location

History

About 300 stones and five cairns were erected here, and a stone circle. Their origin is a mystery, some placing them in the Neolithic and others much more recently (the 19th century).

Description

121 stones survive, of which 93 are standing and 28 have fallen. They are scattered widely without any clear pattern, except for some in threes (a tall stone, a short stone and a slab), some in pairs (aligned N-S or E-W), and sixteen that form a stone circle 70 m (77 yds) across. The cairns have all been removed.

References

National Monuments in County Tipperary
Megalithic monuments in Ireland